Laine Snook (born 1968) is a former strongman and professional Highland Games competitor. As an athlete he competed internationally but his career was cut short by injury. He went on to specialise in strength based sport and represented both England and Great Britain in various Highland Games and strength athletic events. He also became the world benchpress champion. He has gained international renown in strength sport for being one of the world's foremost exponents of grip strength.

Early life
Laine's father ran a large transport company, something which Laine would go on to emulate in running Devon Fleet's Hereford Branch. By the age of 12 Laine was 6'2'' and 15 stone. He became a shot putter and Geoff Capes became his coach.

Sporting career
Winning such events as the AAA Midland Counties championship in 1994, (following in the footsteps of athletes such as Bill Tancred and Andy Drzewiecki) were platforms to Laine performing at international level. However, an operation on his spine forced him to abandon a career as an athlete. He therefore began concentrating on other strength sports such as bench pressing and grip strength.

As a bench presser he has won the British and European championships super-heavyweight division on numerous occasions. In 1997 and 1999 he was the winner of the World Bench Press Championships. Snook travelled the world defending this record and reached a 92 repetitions in one minute on a Guinness world record show in Spain in 2006.

As a strength athlete he competed in national level events in the United Kingdom and was a finalist in both 2000 and 2001 in Britain's Strongest Man.

He is also a successful Highland Games competitor and 2001 became the world caber-tossing champion.

In 2006, Snook began training rigorously once more, in his home gym six days a week for two hours a day. He began to develop the grip strength facet of strength sports and has since notched up numerous notable achievements. On 1 August 2006 he became the world record holder in the international recognised Rolling Thunder lift, deemed by Ironmind as one of the ultimate tests of grip strength. This was done at Pullum Sports, Luton Laine was then unable to attend the 2008 World Championships, won by Mark Felix, due to injury. On March 18, 2008, at the OHF dinner, Snook cleaned the Thomas Inch Challenge Dumbbell, becoming the second person in history to achieve this feat. Later that evening he succeeded in deadlifting the Millennium Dumbbell (231 lbs) and the Thomas Inch Dumbbell (172 lbs) simultaneously. In August 2008, snook cleaned the "Super Nova" kettlebell (185 lbs) to the shoulder becoming the first person in the world to perform this feat. On 21 December 2008, at the Whey Power Challenge Laine Snook hoisted two Millennium Dumbbells, dumbbells with "handles as thick as a Coke can" weighing 230 lbs each. Commenting on this, Randall J. Strossen noted that Laine Snook had first come to the attention of the grip strength world when he certified on the No. 3 Captains of Crush Gripper, officiated by Jamie Reeves. Augmenting his reputation, his world record in the Rolling Thunder combined with the Millennium Dumbbell feat have led Strossen to say that Laine has started "to produce some marks that will astound the grip world".
On the 4th of April 2015, Laine Snook broke the world record on IronMind's LittleBigHorn with a lift of 107.29kg/236lbs.

References

1969 births
British strength athletes
Living people
English strength athletes